Cham-e Murt (also Romanized as Cham-e Mūrt; also known as Cham-e Mūrd and Jadsir) is a village in Mamulan Rural District, Mamulan District, Pol-e Dokhtar County, Lorestan Province, Iran. At the 2006 census, its population was 529, in 118 families.

References 

Towns and villages in Pol-e Dokhtar County